Chelidonia was a Benedictine hermitess. She was born in Ciculum, Italy, and became a recluse in the mountains near Subiaco, choosing a home, as a hermitess, in a cave now called Marra Ferogna. Chelidonia later received her habit from Cardinal Cuno of Frascati.

Notes

Italian Roman Catholic saints
12th-century Christian saints
1152 deaths
Benedictine nuns
Year of birth unknown